Maenza is a surname. Notable people with the surname include:

Ernestina Maenza (1909–1995), Spanish alpine skier
Vincenzo Maenza (born 1962), Italian Greco-Roman wrestler

See also
 Maenza